Jonathan Mark Phillips (born 5 September 1963) is an English actor. He is best known for portraying Charles Lightoller in the film Titanic (1997).

Life and career 
Philips is best known for his portrayal of 2nd Officer Charles Lightoller in the 1997 blockbuster film Titanic. He also appeared in an episode of Midsomer Murders entitled Country Matters.

In 2012, he appeared in 11 episodes of I Shouldn't Be Alive a documentary television series as 'David Hunt'.

In 2012 he starred in a new series Hunted for BBC One and HBO. He plays DI 'Evertt', a corrupt police Detective Inspector.

In 2013 he appeared in an episode of Death in Paradise credited as Jonny Phillips. Since 2014 played in a leading role Father Crowe in the Webseries The Outer Darkness.

In 2014 he appeared as Alistair Stoke, a neurosurgeon, in Entry Wounds Pt 1 in series 8 of Inspector Lewis.

Selected filmography
Rumpelstiltskin (1987) - Ralph
Prick Up Your Ears (1987) - Youth Outside Lavatory
Sleeping Beauty (1987) - Count
The Last of England (1987) - Various roles
Killing Dad or How to Love Your Mother (1990) - Terry 
Max and Helen (1990)
Clarissa (1991) (TV miniseries) - James
The Mystery of Edwin Drood (1993) - Edwin Drood
 Agatha Christie’s Poirot (1993)- Charles Leverson
The Infiltrator (1995 film) -Mahlich
Titanic (1997) - 2nd Officer Charles Lightoller
The Quarry (1998) - Captain Mong 
Beautiful People (1999) - Brian North
The Last Great Wilderness (2002) - Vincente
One for the Road (2003) - Ian
Vanity Fair (2004) - Mr. Wenham
The Edge of Love (2008) - John Eldridge
Bronson (2008) - Prison Governor
Big Things (2009) - Graham Beace
You Instead (2011) - Jay
The Death of Stalin (2017) - NKVD Officer Pervak

References

External links
 

1963 births
Living people
English male film actors
English male stage actors
English male television actors
20th-century English male actors
21st-century English male actors
Male actors from London
Alumni of RADA